The island of Borneo is located on the Sunda Shelf, which is an extensive region in Southeast Asia of immense importance in terms of biodiversity, biogeography and phylogeography of fauna and flora that had attracted Alfred Russel Wallace and other biologists from all over the world.

The previous climatic oscillation and sea level changes leading to contraction and expansion of the tropical rain contributed to the extinction and genetic divergence of species in the region. Harrison (1958) was the first to discover of intermittent human habitation about 49,000 years ago in the Niah Cave National Park. Baker et al.(2007) unravelled the complexities of the late Pleistocene to Holocene habitation of the Niah Cave.

Flenley (1998) and Bird et al. (2005) suggested of a continuous savanna habitat with from the Asian mainland into Borneo and interrupted by a network of ancient Sunda River system. Dodson et al. (1995) postulated that the biogeographical history of Southeast Asia contributed to extensive admixture during Pleistocene low sea levels of genetic groups of an obligate freshwater fish (the river catfish, Hemibagrus nemurus) isolated during periods of high sea levels. During Pleistocene glacial maxima, the sea level was lower than at present and the islands of the Sunda shelf (Sumatra, Borneo and Java) and the Asian mainland were connected by lowlands traversed by rivers. Thus, the fish from Baram, Endau and Mekong rivers were genetically related.
 
Piper et al. (2008) identified 27 mammal, 11 bird and eight reptile taxa recovered from the Terminal Pleistocene deposits at Niah Cave. Some of these animals are extinct and extent in distribution in Borneo. Other biologists suggested Pleistocene refugia found in Borneo to explain for the gene flow and genetic divergent of certain species.

Biodiversity factors in Borneo and extinction

Borneo island, made up of three countries which are Malaysia (Sabah and Sarawak), Brunei (Sultanate) and Indonesia (Kalimantan), is the third largest island in the world. Borneo island is a region that is rich in biodiversity. It consists of 15,000 plant species, and more than 1,400 amphibians, birds, fish, mammals, reptiles and insects. One of the amazing plants that you can find in Borneo is Rafflesia, which is the largest flower in the world. Biomes refer to the major ecological community, which predominant vegetation and characterized by adaptations of organisms to that particular environment. Borneo forests are some of the most biodiverse on the planet and with ideal climate to contain organisms. Some of the forests in Borneo are tropical rainforests, mangroves swamp forests, peat swamp forests, montane forests, heath forests and dipterocarp forests. These physically diverse habitat provide different conditions for different organisms to live. Therefore, the biodiversity is increasing as the organisms have found their own favorite habitat to live. For example, orange utan exist only on the islands of Borneo and Sumatra because orange utan is dependence on forests for fruits and shelters. Another factor contribute to the high level of biodiversity in Borneo is the evolution of species in Borneo. Evolution can be defined as all the changes that have occurred in living things since beginning of life. Evolution provide the better adaptation for the species. There is still many undiscovered species in Borneo. One of the recent new species discovered in Borneo is the lungless frog, which can fly. The high level of biodiversity will be formed if there is a small variation in environmental conditions and a moderate amount of disturbance. A stable condition is favored by species if compared to unstable condition. Species can develop and reproduce if the situation is favorable. No doubt, a disaster can totally cause extinction to an area, for example: flood in Thailand (2011). However, a small or moderate amount of disturbance may increase the biodiversity as well. This has happened when farmers burn a small area of forest for their plantation. Glacial phenomena on Mount Kinabalu as evidence of the snow fall and ice-capped mountains in the hot equatorial region [and ice sheet on lowland areas in the temperate regions described in many other papers]. The effects of LGM were for the Last Glacial Maximum, temperatures  lower than at present are recorded. Globally, because of lowering of temperature caused climate change, ice/snow built up on mountains, there was a break in the hydrological cycle so that the water was not discharged back into the rivers and seas. Thus the sea level dropped to 120 m from the present. Vegetational belts and mammalian communities underwent major reorganisation. All shallow seabeds were exposed causing Peninsular Malaysia to be connected by land-bridges to Borneo, Sumatra, Java and Bali to become a big landmass changing the wind direction, sea current, and separating the population into several isolated forested refuges.

It is unknown if the Bornean tiger became extinct in recent times or prehistoric times.

See also
Fauna of Borneo
Flora of Borneo
:Category:Endemic fauna of Borneo
:Category:Endemic flora of Borneo

References

Bibliography
Glacial phenomena on Mount Kinabalu, Sabah. BN Koopmans, PH Stauffer - Borneo Region, Malaysia Geological Survey Bulletin, 1968.
Elevational diversity patterns of small mammals on Mount Kinabalu, Sabah, Malaysia. SMD Nor - Global Ecology and Biogeography, 2001
Riverine effects on mitochondrial structure of Bornean orang-utans (Pongo pygmaeus) at two spatial scales. MF Jalil, J Cable, J Sinyor, I Lackman- … - Molecular
Late Quaternary glaciation and periglacial phenomena in Australia and New GuineaRW Galloway, GS Hope, E Löffler, JA Peterson - Palaeoecology of Africa and of the …, 1973
The Birds of Mt Kinabalu and their Zoogeographical Relationships. BE Smythies - Proceedings of the Royal Society of London. Series B, …, 1964
The effect of climatic change on southeast Asian geomorphology. HT Verstappen - Journal of Quaternary Science, 1997.
Interstadial records of the last glacial period at Pantai Remis, Malaysia. B Kamaludin, BY Azmi - Journal of Quaternary Science, 1997 - interscience.wiley.com
An altitudinal transect study of the vegetation on Mount Kinabalu, Borneo by Kitayama
Kishen Bunya (presenter), Titol Peter Malim, Wahap Marni, Huzal Irwan Hussin, Khairul Nizam Kamaruddin, Mohd Nizam Mat Saad,  M.T. Abdullah. 2011.  A Brief Survey of Mammals in Imbak Canyon Conservation Area, Sabah.  Seminar on Imbak Canyon Scientific Expedition 14–15 March 2011 Promenade Hotel, Kota Kinabalu, Sabah.
Abdullah, M.T., Wong, S.F, and Besar Ketol. 2010. Catalogue of mammals of UNIMAS Zoological Museum, Universiti Malaysia Sarawak Publication, Kota Samarahan.
Abdullah MT, NH Hasan, FAA Khan, JJ Rovie-Ryan, JV Kumaran, Y Esa, IV Paul, and LS Hall. 2009. Review on the molecular phylogeny of selected Malaysian Bats. pp28–33. In G Ainsworth and S Garnett (eds). RIMBA: Sustainable forest livelihoods in Malaysia and Australia, Universiti Kebangsaan Malaysia, Universiti Malaysia Sarawak and Charles Darwin University.
CBD. http://www.cbd.int/convention/text/
www.cbd.int/incentives/doc/biodiv-economic-value-en.pdf
CIA Fact 2011.  https://www.cia.gov/the-world-factbook/countries/malaysia/
Clements, R., Rayan, D.M., Abdul Wahab Ahmad Zafir, Venkataraman, A., Alfred, R,  Payne, J., Ambu, L., Sharm, D.S.K. 2010. Trio under threat: can we secure the future of rhinos, elephants and tigers in Malaysia? Biodiversity Conservation. DOI 10.1007/s10531-009-9775-3. On-line Springer.
Costanza, R. d’Arge, R. de Groot, S. Farberk, M. Grasso, B. Hannon, K. Limburg, S. Naeem, R. V. O’Neill, J. Paruelo, R. G. Raskin, P. Suttonkk and M. van den Belt. 1997. The value of the world’s ecosystem services and natural capital. Nature, 387: 253-260.
Dasmann, R. F. 1968. A Different Kind of Country. MacMillan Company, New York. .
Erwin TL. 1983. Tropical forest canopies, the last biotic frontier. Bulletin of the Entomological Society of America 29: 14–19.
Khan, M.K.M, Abdullah, M.T, Rahman, M.A., Nor, B.M. 1992. IS TRANSLOCATION A MANAGEMENT TOOL? Gajah 9: 15-18.
Koh, L.P., Ghazoul, J., Butler, R.A., Laurance, W.F., Sodhi, N.S., Mateo-Vega, J., Bradshaw, C.J.A. 2010. Wash and spin cycle threats to tropical biodiversity. Biotropica 42(1): 67-71.
Latiff, A., A. H. Zakri. 2000. Protection of Traditional Knowledge, Innovations and Practices: The Malaysian Experience. UNCTAD Expert Meeting on Systems and National Experiences for Protecting Traditional Knowledge, Innovations and Practices.

Borneo
Borneo
 
.